Ryōgen-in (龍源院) is a subtemple of the Daitoku-ji Buddhist complex, located in Kita-ku, Kyoto, Japan. It was constructed in 1502.

There are five gardens adjoining the abbot's residence, including Totekiko (claimed to be the smallest Japanese rock garden), Isshi-dan, Koda-tei, and Ryogin-tei (a moss-covered garden which is claimed to be the oldest garden in Daitoku-ji, and has been attributed to Sōami).

See also 
 List of National Treasures of Japan (temples)
 For an explanation of terms concerning Japanese Buddhism, Japanese Buddhist art, and Japanese Buddhist temple architecture, see the Glossary of Japanese Buddhism.

External links

 Pictures of Ryōgen-in Zen Garden
 Other pictures of Ryōgen-in
 Panoramic view

Religious buildings and structures completed in 1502
Buddhist temples in Kyoto
Important Cultural Properties of Japan